Jo Tae-eok (1675–5 November 1728), also known as Cho T'aeŏk, was a scholar-official and Jwauijeong of the Joseon Dynasty Korea in the 18th century.

He was also diplomat and ambassador, representing Joseon interests in the 8th Edo period diplomatic mission to the Tokugawa shogunate in Japan.

1711 mission to Japan
In 1711, King Sukjong of Joseon directed that a mission to the shogunal court of Tokugawa Ienobu should be sent to Edo. This diplomatic mission functioned to the advantage of both the Japanese and the Koreans as a channel for developing a political foundation for trade.

This delegation was explicitly identified by the Joseon court as a "Communication Envoy" (tongsinsa).  The mission was understood to signify that relations were "normalized."

The delegation arrived in the 1st year of Shōtoku, according to the Japanese calendar in use at that time. Jo Tae-eok was the chief envoy of this diplomatic embassy.

Recognition in the West
Jo Tae-eok's historical significance was confirmed when his mission and his name were specifically mentioned in a widely distributed history published by the Oriental Translation Fund in 1834.

In the West, early published accounts of the Joseon kingdom are not extensive, but they are found in Sangoku Tsūran Zusetsu (published in Paris in 1832), and in Nihon ōdai ichiran (published in Paris in 1834).  Joseon foreign relations and diplomacy are explicitly referenced in the 1834 work.

Selected works
 1711 -- Dongsarok.
 1712 -- Conversation by Writing in Jianggnan (Ganggwan pildam).

See also
 Joseon diplomacy
 Joseon missions to Japan
 Joseon tongsinsa

Notes

References

 Daehwan, Noh.  "The Eclectic Development of Neo-Confucianism and Statecraft from the 18th to the 19th Century," Korea Journal (Winter 2003).
 Kim, Tae-Jun and Kyong-hee Lee. (2006). Korean Travel Literature. Seoul: Ewha Womans University Press. ; ; 
 Lewis, James Bryant. (2003). Frontier contact between chosŏn Korea and Tokugawa Japan. London: Routledge. 
 Titsingh, Isaac, ed. (1834). [Siyun-sai Rin-siyo/Hayashi Gahō, 1652], Nipon o daï itsi ran; ou,  Annales des empereurs du Japon.  Paris: Oriental Translation Fund of Great Britain and Ireland.  OCLC  84067437
 Walker, Brett L.  "Foreign Affairs and Frontiers in Early Modern Japan: A Historiographical Essay," Early Modern Japan. Fall, 2002, pp. 44–62, 124-128.
 Walraven, Boudewijn and Remco E. Breuker. (2007). Korea in the middle: Korean studies and area studies; Essays in Honour of Boudewijn Walraven. Leiden: CNWS Publications. ;

External links
 Joseon Tongsinsa Cultural Exchange Association ; 
 조선통신사연구 (Journal of Studies in Joseon Tongsinsa) 

1675 births
1728 deaths
18th-century Korean people
Korean diplomats